Lisa Erin Goldstein (born July 30, 1981) is a retired American television, film and theatre actress.  She is most known for her role as Millicent Huxtable on One Tree Hill.

Personal life and education
Goldstein was born on Long Island, New York and lived in London, England until the age of 4. She also lived in Pennsylvania as a child and then New York, North Carolina, California and Florida where she worked and went to school. She graduated from Hingham High School (Hingham, Massachusetts) in 1999. Afterwards, Goldstein went to Elon University (Elon, NC) where she received her BFA in Music Theatre in 2003. She then interned at B Street Theatre in Sacramento, California.

Goldstein is currently married and lives in Florida with her husband sports coordinator; Brendan Kirsch. She met him on the One Tree Hill set where he was basketball coordinator.
On January 5, 2014, Goldstein and her husband announced via Twitter that the couple are expecting their first child. On July 11, 2014, Goldstein gave birth to the couple's first child, a boy whom they named Flynn Robert Kirsch. She is now retired from acting.

Career
After college, Goldstein worked at regional theaters in several musicals, including Smokey Joe's Cafe, Victor Victoria, and Anything Goes.

In early 2007, Goldstein signed a contract with Walt Disney World in Orlando, Florida where she played Belle in Beauty and the Beast – The Musical, and Nemo, Pearl and Squirt in Finding Nemo – The Musical.

In July 2007, Goldstein was cast in The CW's popular drama series One Tree Hill as Millicent Huxtable. She was cast only for the first episode of season five. However, after seeing her performance in that episode, the writers decided to bring her character back for the remainder of the season. In season six she became a regular and was on the show until the final season.

In early 2008, Goldstein filmed an independent film Who Do You Love?, portraying Phil Chess's wife Sheva Chess. She also appeared in the music video for fellow One Tree Hill co-star Kate Voegele's song "Only Fooling Myself," which was directed by the show's creator and executive producer Mark Schwahn.

Goldstein's last acting credit was for the film Don't Know Yet before she left acting for good.

Filmography

References

External links

1981 births
21st-century American actresses
Living people
Actresses from New York (state)
American film actresses
American stage actresses
American television actresses
Elon University alumni
People from Long Island